The Genetically Modified Tomato Awards (Turkish: Hormonlu Domates Ödülleri) are annual awards given by the Turkish LGBT community to queerphobic people and institutions in order to catch attention to homophobia, transphobia and sexual discrimination. The first Genetically Modified Tomato Awards were given in 2005 by Lambda Istanbul, and it is currently given by the Istanbul Pride Committee. The title of the award comes from sports commentator Erman Toroğlu, who infamously said that the "genetically modified tomatoes are turning people gay".

Due to COVID-19 regulations, 2020 award ceremony was planned to be livestreamed on YouTube, but it was later removed for "Violation of Terms of Service", then later held on Zoom.

Winners

2005 

 Lifetime Genetically Modified Tomato - Jury Special Award: Erman Toroğlu

2006

2007

2008

2009 
Best in Psychiatry/Psychology: Nevzat Tarhan
Best Writer: Ali Bulaç
Best Official Institution: Directorate of Religious Affairs
Best Politician: Burhan Kuzu
Best in Media: Vakit
Best Social Place: Miko Kafe
Best TV Personality: Fikret Kuşkan
Best TV Show: Çok Güzel Hareketler Bunlar
Best Film: Recep İvedik
International Award: Pope Benedict XVI and the Catholic Church

2010 
Best in Psychiatry/Psychology: Cem Keçe
Best Writer: Hilal Kaplan
Best Civil Organization: Mazlumder, Özgürder, IHH and 24 others
Best Official Institution/Politician: General Directorate of Security
Best in Media: Vakit
Best Social Place: The Hall
Best TV Personality: Esra Erol
Best in Education: Ministry of National Education
International Award: Serbia and the Serbian police
Lifetime Genetically Modified Tomato - Jury Special Award: Selma Aliye Kavaf

2011 
Best Official Institution: Turkish Armed Forces
Best Organization: Justice and Development Party
Best Civil Organization: Gazeteciler ve Yazarlar Vakfı
Best Writer: Fatih Altaylı
Best Newspaper Sabah
Best in Education: Middle East Technical University
Best Social Place: Taksim Live
Best TV Personality: Osman Sınav
International Award: Malmö Municipality ve and the Swedish Police Authority
Pink Wash Award: IGLYO

2012 
Best in Psychiatry/Psychology: Yusuf Karaçay
Best Writer: Ayşe Kulin
Best Organization: Justice and Development Party
Best Civil Organization: Ahmet Faruk Ünsal and Recep Karagöz from Mazlumder
Best Politician: Melih Gökçek
Best in Media: Yeni Akit 
Best Social Place: Taksim Mango 
Best TV Personality: İlkbar Gürpınar
International Award: Northern Cyprus   
Lifetime Genetically Modified Tomato - Jury Special Award: İdris Naim Şahin

2013 
Best TV Show: Pis Yedili
Best Social Place: The Hall
Best Writer: Engin Ardıç
Best Politician: Bekir Bozdağ
Best Organization: Justice and Development Party
International Award: Russia
Lifetime Genetically Modified Tomato - Jury Special Award: Türkan Dağoğlu
Penguin Special Award: 
Best Politician: Melih Gökçek and Recep Tayyip Erdoğan 
Best TV Channel: Habertürk TV 
Best Newspaper and Writer: Yeni Şafak and Nihal Bengisu Karaca

2014 
Best Official Institution: Ministry of the Interior
Best Politician: Recep Tayyip Erdoğan
Best in Media: Yeni Akit
Best in Entertainment: Okan Bayülgen
Best in Education: Yeditepe University
Best in Sports: Mateja Kežman
Best Social Place: Kızılay Shopping Center
Best in Censoring: Grand National Assembly of Turkey
International Award: Russia

2015 
 Best in Education: İhsan Karaman
 Best Publication: Kızları Kız, Erkekleri Erkek Gibi Yetiştirmek (Raising Girls Like Girls, and Raising Boys Like Boys) by Banu Yaşar
 Best in Censoring: Zorlu PSM
 Best Official Institution: Turkish Language Association
 Best in Sports: Fenerbahçe S.K.
 Best in Media: Engin Ardıç
 Best Politician: Recep Tayyip Erdoğan
 Best in Entertainment: Niran Ünsal
 International Award: Switzerland (immigration office)

2016 
 Best in Education: Istanbul University
 Best in Health: Cüneyt Genç
 Best Official Institution: Esat Police Station
 Best in Media: 140journos
 Best TV Personality: Can Yaman
 Best in Targeting: Young Islamic Defense
 Best Politician: Bülent Arınç
 International Award: Homophobic attackers in CERN

2017 

 Best in Entertainment: Nihat Doğan and Demet Akalın
 Best in Health: Macfit
 Best in Censoring: International Istanbul Film Festival
 Best Social Place: Tek Yön and Love
 Best in Politics: Ankara Regional Court of Appeal 17th Penal Chamber
 Best Media: Yeni Akit
 Best in Education: Kinder Chocolate
 International Award: Chechnya and Russia

2018 
 Best in Entertainment: Hilal Cebeci
 Best in Education: Doğan Azezli
 Best TV Personalities: Seda Akgül and Hakan Ural
 Best in Media: Atilla Dorsay
 Best Institution: Turkish Red Crescent
 Best in Politics: Governor of Ankara
 International Award: Donald Trump
 Special Misogyny Award: Rüzgar Erkoçlar

2019 
 Best Institution: TİHAK and the Directorate of Religious Affairs
 Best Civil Organization: Pedagogy Association
 Best TV Channel: TV5
 Best in Politics: Alinur Aktaş
 Best Governor: Governor of Ankara
 Special Award: Governor of Istanbul
 Best in Media: Yeni Akit
 Best in Education: Verşan Kök
 Best in Entertainment: Mustafa Ceceli
 Best Social Place: Sensus Şarap Evi Galata
 International Award: Donald Trump
 Special Bi+phobia Award: Söylemezsem Olmaz
 Lifetime Genetically Modified Tomato - Jury Special Award: Süleyman Soylu

2020 
 Best Institution: Directorate of Religious Affairs
 Best in Politics: Doğu Perinçek
 Best in Education: Boğaziçi University Rectorate
 Best in Medicine: Metin Çakır
 Best Civil Organization: Association of Lawyers
 Best in Media: Hilal Kaplan
 Best TV Personality: İsmail Küçükkaya
 Best Online Application: Ekşi Sözlük
 Best in Gay-centrism: Gmag
 Transphobia Special Award: J. K. Rowling
 International Award: Viktor Orbán
 Surprise Award: Directorate of Religious Affairs President Ali Erbaş

References 

Homophobia
LGBT-related awards
LGBT events in Turkey
Annual events in Turkey
Recurring events established in 2005